Olympiacós Sýndesmos Filáthlon Peiraiós (Olympic Club of Fans of Piraeus) is a major multi-sport club based in Piraeus, Greece. Olympiacos is parent to a number of different competitive departments which participate in football, basketball, volleyball, water polo, handball, athletics, swimming, table tennis and boxing amongst many othersand have won numerous European and domestic titles over the club's history.

Olympiacos CFP is one of the most successful and decorated multi-sport clubs in Europe, being the only Greek club, as well as one of the few European multi-sport clubs to have won as many as 21 International titles –including 19 major European titles, 1 Intercontinental title and 1 Balkan title– in six sports (Football, Basketball, Volleyball, Water Polo, Wrestling, Table Tennis) (no other Greek club have won more than seven European titles). Overall, Olympiacos is the most successful Greek multi-sport club in terms of International titles won (21), European titles won (19), European Championships won (8), participations in European and International finals (44 –21 times Champions, 23 times Runners-up–) and the only Greek multi-sport club to have won European titles in three different team sports (basketball, volleyball, water polo). They have won European titles with seven of their sports departments (men's basketball, men's volleyball, women's volleyball, men's water polo, women's water polo, men's wrestling, men's table tennis) while no other multi-sport club in Greece has more than two European title-winning sports departments.

Specifically, Olympiacos Football Team has won 1 Balkans Cup (1963), Olympiacos Men's Basketball Team have won 3 Euroleagues (1997, 2012, 2013) and 1 FIBA Intercontinental Cup (2013), Olympiacos Men's Volleyball Team have won 2 CEV Cups (1996, 2005) and 1 CEV Challenge Cup (2023),  Olympiacos women's volleyball team have won 1 CEV Challenge Cup (2018), Olympiacos Men's Water Polo Team have won 2 LEN Champions Leagues (2002, 2018) and 1 LEN Super Cup (2002), Olympiacos women's water polo team have won 3 LEN Euro Leagues (2015, 2021, 2022), 1 LEN Trophy (2014) and 3 LEN Super Cups (2015, 2021, 2022), Olympiacos Men's Wrestling Team has won 1 European CELA Cup (2006) and Olympiacos Men's Table Tennis Team have won 1 ETTU Europe Trophy (2023). In total, Olympiacos departments (Football, Basketball, Volleyball, Water Polo, Wrestling, Table Tennis) have reached 44 times the final (21 times Champions, 23 times Runners-up) of the most prestigious and important European and Worldwide competitions, which is an all-time record for a Greek multi-sport club.

The club has also won one Triple Crown in Men's basketball in 1997 (FIBA Euroleague, Greek League, Greek Cup), two Quadruple Crowns in 2002 and 2018 in Men's water polo (2002 LEN Chanpions League, 2002 LEN Super Cup, 2002 Greek Championship, 2002 Greek Cup – 2018 LEN Champions League, 2018 Greek Championship, 2018 Greek Cup, 2018 Greek Super Cup), two Quadruple Crowns in 2021 and 2022 (2021 LEN Euro League, 2021 LEN Super Cup, 2021 Greek League, 2021 Greek Cup – 2022 LEN Euroleague, 2022 LEN Super Cup, 2022 Greek League, 2022 Greek Cup) and one continental Treble in 2015 (2015 LEN Euroleague, 2015 LEN Super Cup, 2015 Greek League) in women's water polo and one continental Treble in women's volleyball in 2018 (CEV Challenge Cup, Greek championship, Greek Cup).

With the 2002 achievement, Olympiacos Men's Water Polo Team became the first club ever in Water polo history (since the establishment of the modern Champions League format in 1996) to win four out of four competitions in a single year, thus completing the quadruple. After the 2015 LEN Euroleague win of Olympiacos women's water polo team, Olympiacos CFP became the only multi-sport club in European Water Polo history after Pro Recco to have been crowned European Champions with both its men's and women's departments, and the only one with both its departments currently active (Pro Recco women's department has been dissolved since 2012).

A similar impressive feat was achieved by Olympiacos CFP in another team sport in 2018: after the 2017–18 CEV Women's Challenge Cup win of Olympiacos women's volleyball department, Olympiacos CFP became the only multi-sport club in Greece and one of the very few in European volleyball history to have won European titles with its men's and women's teams.

Olympiacos men's basketball team holds several distinctions. Winning their third Euroleague title in 2013, they are the inaugural and only Greek club (only the third club in European basketball history) to be consecutive title defenders in the modern Final Four era of the Euroleague. They beat Real Madrid in the final of the 2012–13 Euroleague Final Four in London, 100–88.

Olympiacos CFP has nurtured some of the greatest Greek athletes. Olympiacos' athletes have become Olympic medal winners, as well as World and European champions, while they are integral part of the Greek national teams. The club maintains Academies with state of the art training facilities, where thousands of children have the opportunity to learn about sports and practice. Olympiacos CFP have granted Greek sports and the club itself numerous Olympic, Worldwide and European honours. Olympiacos had 30 of its athletes and coaches from nine of its sports departments participating in the 2016 Summer Olympics.

Olympiacos is the most popular Greek club with around four million fans inside Greece and millions of others in the Greek communities all over the world. As of April 2006, Olympiacos has 83,000 registered members and is placed in the top ten of the clubs with the most paying members in the world, holding the ninth place just ahead of Real Madrid. In 2014, that figure increased and the team boasts 98,000 registered members. Olympiacos CFP was the first Greek club that made it possible for its fans to become members, and granted them the right of voting for the board of directors.

History 

Olympiacos CFP was founded on March 10, 1925 in Piraeus, as a football club initially, and the club's aim, as stated in the statutes, is the systematic cultivation and development of its athletes’ possibilities for participation in athletic competitions, the spreading of the Olympic athletic ideal and the promotion of sportsmanship and fanship among the youth according to egalitarian principles, by stressing a healthy, ethical and social basis as its foundation. Members of "Piraikos Podosfairikos Omilos FC" (Sport and Football Club of Piraeus) and "Piraeus Fans Club FC" decided, during a historical assembly, to dissolve the two clubs in order to establish a new unified one, which would bring this new vision and dynamic to the community. Notis Kamperos, a senior officer of the Hellenic Navy, proposed the name Olympiacos and the profile of a laurel-crowned Olympic winner as the emblem of the new club. Michalis Manouskos, a prominent Piraeus industrialist, expanded the name to its complete and current status, Olympiacos Syndesmos Filathlon Pireos, a name that symbolizes and encompasses the morality, the honour, the vying, the splendor, the sportsmanship and the fair play value of the Olympic ideal of Ancient Greece, which was totally consistent with the club's emblem. Besides Kamperos and Manouskos, among the most notable founding members were Stavros Maragoudakis, the Post Office director, Nikos Andronikos, a merchant, Dimitrios Sklias, a Hellenic Army officer, Nikolaos Zacharias, an attorney, Athanasios Mermigas, a notary public, Kostas Klidouchakis, who became the first goalkeeper in the club's history, Ioannis Kekkes, a stockbroker, and above all, the Andrianopoulos family. Andrianopoulos, a family of well-established Piraeus merchants, played a pivotal role in the founding of Olympiacos. The five brothers, Yiannis, Giorgos, Dinos, Vassilis and Leonidas Andrianopoulos raised the reputation of the club and brought it to its current glory. Yiannis, Giorgos, Dinos and Vassilis were the first to play, while Leonidas, the youngest of the five, made his debut later on and played for the club for eight years (1927–1935). The club's offensive line, made up of the five brothers, became legendary, rising to a mythical status and soon Olympiacos gained enormous popularity and became the most successful and well-supported club in Greece. Olympiacos is also known as Thrylos (The Legend), after the legendary, classic side of the 1950s which won a hatful of titles.

Olympiacos departments – history and honours

Team sports

Football 

Olympiacos football team is the most successful club in Greek football history, having won 47 League titles, 28 Cups and 4 Super Cups, all records. Τotalling 79 national trophies, Olympiacos is 9th in the world in total titles won by a football club. The club's dominating success can be further evidenced by the fact that all other Greek clubs have won a combined total of 38 League titles, while Olympiacos also holds the record for the most consecutive Greek League titles won, with seven in a row in two occasions (1997–2003 and 2011–2017), breaking their own previous record of six consecutive wins in the 1950s (1954–1959), when Olympiacos was unequivocally nicknamed Thrylos ("The Legend").

Having won the 2014–15 league title, Olympiacos became the only football club in the world to have won a series of five or more consecutive championships for five times in their history, a record that was praised by FIFA with a congratulatory letter of its president, Sepp Blatter. They are also the only Greek club to have won five consecutive national Cups (1957–1961), as well as six League titles undefeated (1937, 1938, 1948, 1951, 1954, 1955). Olympiacos are one of only three clubs to have never been relegated from the top flight of Greek football, and by winning the 2012–13 title, their 40th in total, they added a fourth star above their crest, each one representing 10 League titles.

In European competitions, Olympiacos best performances are their presence in the UEFA Champions League quarter-finals in 1998–99, losing the semi-final spot in the last minutes of their second leg match against Juventus, as well as in the UEFA Cup Winners' Cup quarter-finals in 1992–93. The Red-Whites are the highest ranked Greek club in the UEFA rankings, occupying the 29th place in Europe as of 2018, and one of the founding members of the European Club Association. Olympiacos won the Balkans Cup in 1963, at a time when the competition was considered the second most important in the region after the European Cup, becoming the first ever Greek club to win an international competition.

 Balkans Cup
 Winners (1) (shared Greek record): 1963
 Greek Championship
 Winners (47) (record): 1931, 1933, 1934, 1936, 1937, 1938, 1947, 1948, 1951, 1954, 1955, 1956, 1957, 1958, 1959, 1966, 1967, 1973, 1974, 1975, 1980, 1981, 1982, 1983, 1987, 1997, 1998, 1999, 2000, 2001, 2002, 2003, 2005, 2006, 2007, 2008, 2009, 2011, 2012, 2013, 2014, 2015, 2016, 2017, 2020, 2021, 2022
 Greek Cup
 Winners (28) (record): 1947, 1951, 1952, 1953, 1954, 1957, 1958, 1959, 1960, 1961, 1963, 1965, 1968, 1971, 1973, 1975, 1981, 1990, 1992, 1999, 2005, 2006, 2008, 2009, 2012, 2013, 2015, 2020
 Greek Super Cup
 Winners (4) (record): 1980, 1987, 1992, 2007
 Greater Greece Cup
 Winners (3) (record): 1969, 1972, 1976

Basketball

Olympiacos men's basketball team is one of the most successful clubs in European basketball, having won three Euroleague Championships, one Triple Crown, one Intercontinental Cup, thirteen Greek Championships, eleven Greek Cups and one Greek Super Cup. As a traditional European powerhouse, Olympiacos have also been five times EuroLeague runners-up and, having played a total of eight finals, they are the Greek club with the most EuroLeague Final appearances. They have also participated in ten EuroLeague Final Fours. They play their home matches at Peace and Friendship Stadium.

They are the first Greek club that ever played in a Euroleague Final (1994), and they won their first Euroleague title in 1997, achieving the first Triple Crown ever for a Greek team. As European champions, Olympiacos played in the 1997 McDonald's Championship and reached the final of the tournament, where they met Michael Jordan's NBA champions, the Chicago Bulls. During the 1990s, besides their constant achievements in EuroLeague, also adding a third place in 1999, Olympiacos dominated the Greek Basket League with five consecutive titles, at a time when the Greek championship was considered Europe's best national basketball league. Thus, FIBA declared Olympiacos as the "Best European Team of the 1990s".

Olympiacos returned to the very top of European basketball in 2010, when they reached the final against Barcelona in Paris, but mostly in 2012, when they won their second EuroLeague title in Istanbul, by rallying from 19 points down in the championship game, to beat CSKA Moscow 62–61, on the last shot of the game, achieving the greatest comeback in European basketball finals history, and one of the greatest ever seen in European continental basketball. In 2013, Olympiacos won their third EuroLeague title and became the only Greek club and only the third club in European basketball history to be crowned back-to-back European champions in the modern EuroLeague Final Four era, after beating Real Madrid 100–88 in the London final. Later on, Olympiacos won the Intercontinental Cup, celebrating a third international title in 17 months.

Intercontinental Cup
Winners (1) (shared Greek record): 2013
European Championship
Winners (3): 1997, 2012, 2013
Greek Championship
Winners (13): 1949, 1960, 1976, 1978, 1993, 1994, 1995, 1996, 1997, 2012, 2015, 2016, 2022
Greek Cup
Winners (11): 1976, 1977, 1978, 1980, 1994, 1997, 2002, 2010, 2011, 2022, 2023
Greek Super Cup
Winners (1): 2022

Men's volleyball

Olympiacos men's volleyball team is the most successful club in Greek volleyball history, having won 30 Greek Volley League titles, 16 Cups, 6 League Cups, all national records, and 2 Super Cups. They are the only volleyball club in Greece to have won a European title, having actually won 3 European titles,  2 CEV Cups in 1996 and 2005 and 1 CEV Challenge Cup in 2023. Olympiacos is a traditional powerhouse in European volleyball, having played in 8 European finals in all three main CEV competitions: 2 times runners-up in the CEV Champions League in 1992 and 2002 (with 7 CEV Champions League final four participations), 2 times winners (1996, 2005) and 2 times runners-up (1997, 1998) in the CEV Cup, one time winners (2023) and one time runners-up (2018) in the CEV Challenge Cup.

Domestically, Olympiacos holds the record for the most consecutive championships won, with eight in a row (1987–1994), and for winning seven championships undefeated (1968, 1974, 1979, 1981, 1988, 1991, 2018). Internationally, their most successful period was between 1992 and 2005, when they came to be included amongst the top volleyball powers in Europe. During this period, apart from their two European trophies, they progressed to eleven final fours in total, seven of them consecutive between 1992 and 1998 (the first four in the CEV Champions League and the next three in the CEV Cup Winners' Cup); they also won a fourth place in the CEV Super Cup and a third in the FIVB Volleyball Men's Club World Championship. Olympiacos came to European prominence again by playing in the 2017–18 CEV Challenge Cup final; at the same time, the women's department won their respective 2017–18 CEV Women's Challenge Cup. In this way, Olympiacos became the first volleyball club that had men and women playing simultaneously in European finals, and one of the very few to have won European trophies in both departments. In 2023, they won the CEV Challenge Cup, beating rivals Panathinaikos in the semi-finals and Maccabi Tel Aviv in the final.

 CEV Cup
 Winners (2) (Greek record): 1996, 2005
 CEV Challenge Cup
 Winners (1) (Greek record): 2023
 Greek Championship
 Winners (30) (record): 1968, 1969, 1974, 1976, 1978, 1979, 1980, 1981, 1983, 1987, 1988, 1989, 1990, 1991, 1992, 1993, 1994, 1998, 1999, 2000, 2001, 2003, 2009, 2010, 2011, 2013, 2014, 2018, 2019, 2021
 Greek Cup
 Winners (17) (record): 1981, 1983, 1989, 1990, 1992, 1993, 1994, 1997, 1998, 1999, 2001, 2009, 2011, 2013, 2014, 2016, 2017
 Greek League Cup
 Winners (6) (record): 2013, 2015, 2016, 2017, 2018, 2019
 Greek Super Cup
 Winners (2): 2000, 2010

Men's water polo

Olympiacos men's water polo team is one of the most successful teams in Europe and a traditional powerhouse of continental water polo, having won 2 LEN Champions Leagues (2001–02, 2017–18), 1 LEN Super Cup (2002) and 2 Triple Crowns (2002, 2018), the only Greek club to have been crowned European Champions. They have also been six times runners-up (counting nine European finals overall), three in the LEN Champions League (2000–01, 2015–16, 2018–19), two in the LEN Cup Winners' Cup (1997–98, 1998–99) and one more in the LEN Super Cup (2018). In 2001–02, Olympiacos became the first club ever in water polo history to win all four competitions they claimed (LEN Champions League, LEN Super Cup, Greek League, and Greek Cup), completing a Continental Quadruple. They won their second Continental Quadruple in 2017–18 season (LEN Champions League, Greek League, Greek Cup, Greek Super Cup). After the 2014–15 LEN Euro League win of the women's department, parent club Olympiacos CFP became the second sports club in continental water polo history to have been crowned European Champions with both its men's and women's teams and the only one in Europe with both these departments currently active.

Domestically, Olympiacos is the most titled club in Greek water polo history, as the club's 64 domestic titles (67 overall) are the most out of any Greek club. They have won 36 League titles, a record 23 Cups, a record 5 Super Cups, and a record 20 Doubles. They are the dominant force since 1992, having set a number of records including a winning streak of 163 straight wins in both the Greek League's regular season and playoffs, which lasted from May 2013 to May 2019.

 European Championship
 Winners (2) (Greek record): 2002, 2018
 European Super Cup
 Winners (1) (Greek record): 2002
 Greek Championship
 Winners (36): 1927, 1933, 1934, 1936, 1947, 1949, 1951, 1952, 1969, 1971, 1992, 1993, 1995, 1996, 1999, 2000, 2001, 2002, 2003, 2004, 2005, 2007, 2008, 2009, 2010, 2011, 2013, 2014, 2015, 2016, 2017, 2018, 2019, 2020, 2021, 2022
 Greek Cup
 Winners (24) (record): 1992, 1993, 1997, 1998, 2001, 2002, 2003, 2004, 2006, 2007, 2008, 2009, 2010, 2011, 2013, 2014, 2015, 2016, 2018, 2019, 2020, 2021, 2022, 2023
 Greek Super Cup
 Winners (5) (record): 1997, 1998, 2018, 2019, 2020

Olympiacos women's water polo

Olympiacos women's water polo team is one of the most successful clubs in Europe and a traditional powerhouse of continental water polo, having won 3 LEN Euro Leagues in 2015, 2021 and 2022, 3 LEN Super Cups in 2015, 2021, 2022 and 1 LEN Trophy in 2014 and having, overall, a commanding presence in European competitions. Besides the 3 LEN Euro Leagues, 3 LEN Super Cups and 1 LEN Trophy titles, they were runners-up of the LEN Euro League in 2017 and 2019, runners-up of the LEN Super Cup in 2014, runners-up of the LEN Trophy in 2008 and 2018 and they have participated, altogether, in 9 Champions' Cup / Euro League Final Fours (1996, 2010, 2011, 2015, 2016, 2017, 2019, 2021, 2022), as well as in 5 LEN Trophy Final Fours (2001, 2007, 2008, 2014, 2018), being semi-finalists of the same competition in 2009 and 2012. Domestically, Olympiacos is the most successful Greek club, having won a record 13 Greek Championships, a record 4 Greek Cups, a record 1 Greek Super Cup and a record 3 Doubles. They also hold the all-time record for the most consecutive Greek Championships, as they are the only team to have won 9 consecutive Greek Championship titles (2014–2022).

In 2014 Olympiacos won the LEN Trophy in the Final Four in Florence, beating home team Firenze 10–9 in the final. One year later, Olympiacos were crowned European Champions, winning the LEN Euro League in the 2015 Final Four in Piraeus, after a 10–9 win in the final against the then-reigning champions Sabadell, who were undefeated for more than 3 years with 115 consecutive wins in all competitions. Olympiacos lifted the LEN Euro League title undefeated and having won 8 straight matches without even a single draw. Subsequently, Olympiacos won the 2015 LEN Super Cup as well, defeating Plebiscito Padova, thus completing a continental Treble in 2015 (LEN Euro League, LEN Super Cup, Greek Championship), winning season's all three available titles.

In 2021 Olympiacos won their second LEN Euro League title in Budapest, beating home teams UVSE (9–8 in the semi-final) and Dunaújvárosi (7–6 in the final) with a roster composed entirely of Greek players. They went on to win the Greek League and the Greek Cup, thus completing the first ever Triple Crown for a Greek club in the sport's history, which eventually became a Quadruple Crown after winning the 2021 LEN Super Cup.

In 2022 Olympiacos were crowned back-to-back European Champions in Piraeus, beating UVSE (18–11 in the semi-final) and Sabadell (11–7 in the final). They went on to win the Greek League, the Greek Cup and the 2022 LEN Super Cup, thus completing the second and back-to-back Quadruple Crown in their history.

After the 2015 LEN Euroleague win of Olympiacos women's water polo team, Olympiacos CFP became the only multi-sport club in European Water Polo history after Pro Recco to have been crowned European Champions with both its men's and women's departments and the only club with both its departments currently active (Pro Recco women's department has been dissolved since 2012).

 European Championship
 Winners (3) (Greek record): 2015, 2021, 2022
 European Super Cup
 Winners (3) (shared European record): 2015, 2021, 2022
 European Cup
 Winners (1): 2014
 Greek Championship
 Winners (13) (record): 1995, 1998, 2009, 2011, 2014, 2015, 2016, 2017, 2018, 2019, 2020, 2021, 2022
 Greek Cup
 Winners (5) (record): 2018, 2020, 2021, 2022, 2023
 Greek Super Cup
 Winners (1) (record):  2020

Olympiacos women's volleyball

Olympiacos women's volleyball team is one of the most successful volleyball clubs in Greece and the country's most successful in European competitions, having won 8 Greek League titles, a record 9 Cups, a record 7 Doubles, a CEV Challenge Cup (2018) and a Continental Treble (2018), the only women's volleyball club in Greece to have won a European title. They hold the unique records for winning eight consecutive Greek League titles (2013–2020), nine consecutive national Cups (2011–2019) and seven consecutive Doubles (2013–2019).

The season 2017–18 was the most successful in the club's history and the most successful by any Greek women's volleyball club in history; besides winning the aforementioned CEV Challenge Cup in their second final presence in a row, they won the domestic competitions undefeated, with 25–0 wins in the League, finishing the season with only two sets lost in an unprecedented 75–2 set record, and 4–0 wins in the Cup with a 12–1 set record, achieving a Continental Treble and their sixth consecutive domestic Double. In the same season, the men's volleyball team reached the CEV Challenge Cup final and Olympiacos became the first Greek volleyball club that had men and women playing simultaneously in European finals, and one of the very few in the continent to have won European trophies in both departments.

 European Cup
 Winners (1) (Greek record): 2018
 Hellenic Championship
 Winners (8): 2013, 2014, 2015, 2016, 2017, 2018, 2019, 2020
 Hellenic Cup
 Winners (9) (record): 2011, 2012, 2013, 2014, 2015, 2016, 2017, 2018, 2019

Women's basketball

Olympiacos women's basketball team was initially founded in 1947, being one of the best women's basketball clubs in Greece during the 1950s and the early 1960s, when they won 3 Women's Division Center Championships (1956, 1958, 1959), which was the most important competition of Greek women's basketball at the time (until 1967–68 when the Greek Women's Basketball League was officially organized). The department was dissolved in the mid-1960s and after a long period of inactivity, it was reorganized in 2015.

In 2015–16 season, which was the first after its reorganization, Olympiacos won the double undefeated; they won the Greek League with 22 wins in 22 matches, sweeping arch-rivals Panathinaikos with 4–0 wins in the finals and also clinched the Greek Cup title, beating Panathinaikos once again in the final (63–60). They managed to repeat this achievement in 2016–17, 2017–18 and 2018–19 seasons, thus winning a record four consecutive undefeated Doubles with a record 134 straight wins in both the Greek Championship and the Greek Cup.

 Greek Championship
 Winners (6): 2016, 2017, 2018, 2019, 2020, 2022
 Greek Cup
 Winners (5) (record): 2016, 2017, 2018, 2019, 2022

Men's handball 

Olympiacos men's handball department was founded in 1931 and it has won 3 Greek Handball Championships, 2 Greek Cups and 2 Doubles.

In 2017–18 season, which was the first after its reorganization, Olympiacos won the domestic double. They won the Greek Handball Championship by beating AEK Athens with 3–2 wins in the finals in a dramatic fashion, as they overturned an initial 0–2 win lead by AEK and took three straight wins to secure the League title. They also won the Greek Cup, beating PAOK in the semi-final and ASE Douka in the final to complete the domestic Double.

 Greek Championship
  Winners (3): 2018, 2019, 2022
 Greek Cup 
 Winners (2): 2018, 2019
  Greek Super Cup
 Winners (1): 2022

Beach volleyball 
 Greek Championship 
 Winners (1): 2016

Individual sports

Swimming 

 Greek Championship
Winners (63) (record): 1929, 1930, 1931, 1932, 1933, 1934, 1937, 1960, 1961, 1962, 1967, 1969, 1970, 1971, 1972, 1973, 1974, 1975, 1976, 1977, 1978, 1979, 1980, 1981, 1982, 1983, 1984, 1985, 1986, 1988, 1989, 1990, 1991, 1992, 1993, 1994, 1996, 1997, 1998, 1999, 2000, 2001, 2002, 2003, 2004, 2005, 2006, 2007, 2008, 2009, 2010, 2011, 2012, 2013, 2014, 2015, 2016, 2017, 2018, 2019, 2020, 2021, 2022
 Greek Cup (25m pool)
 Winners (4): 1997, 1998, 1999, 2001
 Greek Championship (long-distance)
 Winners (9) (record): 2010, 2015, 2016, 2017, 2018, 2019, 2020, 2021, 2022
 Greek Super Cup
 Winners (1) (record): 2015
 Greek Masters Championship 
 Winners (1) (shared record): 2017
 Greek Open Water Championship
 Winners (1) (record): 2017

Athletics                           
 Greek Open Championship (Men)
 Winners (15): 2006, 2007, 2008, 2009, 2010, 2011, 2012, 2013, 2014, 2016, 2017, 2018, 2019, 2020, 2022
 Greek Indoors Championship (Men) 
 Winners (10): 2010, 2011, 2012, 2013, 2015, 2016, 2017, 2018, 2019, 2020
 Greek Cross Country Championship (Men)
 Winners (12): 1965, 1966, 1967, 1984, 2003, 2005, 2007, 2008, 2009, 2010, 2011, 2013
 Panhellenic Club Championship (Men)
 Winners (1): 2000
 Open Greek Championship (Women)
 Winners (1): 2010

Table tennis 

Olympiacos table tennis department was established in 1956 and has both a men's and a women's department. Olympiacos is one of the most succesfull clubs in Greek table tennis history, with its women's department being the most successful, having won a record 27 Greek Leagues and a record 11 Greek Cups. 

Olympiacos men's department are the only Greek men's table tennis team that have won a European title, having won the ETTU Europe Trophy in 2022–23. They have also won 15 Greek Leagues and 7 Greek Cups.
 ETTU Europe Trophy (Men)
 Winners (1) (shared record): 2023
 Greek Championship (Men)
 Winners (15): 1971, 1972, 1973, 1974, 1976, 1977, 1978, 1980, 2004, 2005, 2014, 2016, 2017, 2018, 2022
 Greek Championship (Women) 
 Winners (27) (record):  1954, 1955, 1956, 1957, 1958, 1959, 1960, 1961, 1962, 1964, 1965, 1976, 1977, 1978, 1979, 1981, 1982, 1983, 2000, 2001, 2002, 2005, 2006, 2007, 2009, 2018, 2022
 Greek Cup (Men)
 Winners (7): 1971, 1972, 2003, 2004, 2005, 2008, 2022
 Greek Cup (Women)
 Winners (11) (record): 1965, 1966, 1983, 1984, 1985, 1986, 2001, 2005, 2006, 2007, 2008

Wrestling 
 European Cup
 Winners (1) (Greek record): 2006
 Greek Championship (Men)
 Winners (2): 1976, 2006

Boxing 
 Greek Championship (Men) 
 Winners (7): 1970, 1985, 2017, 2018, 2019, 2021, 2022
 Greek Championship (Women)
 Winners (2): 2012, 2015

Diving 
 Greek Championship
 Winners (9): 1961, 1962, 1963, 1964, 1965, 1966, 1967, 1970, 1971

Sailing 
 Greek Club Championship
 Winners (1): 1954

Gymnastics 
 Greek Championship (Men) 
 Winners (1): 1971

Canoe kayak
 Greek Championship 
 Winners (1): 2018

European and worldwide honours

The gate 7 tragedy 

The history of the Karaiskakis Stadium and Olympiacos was marked by the worst tragedy that ever hit Greek sports, known as the Karaiskakis Stadium disaster. On 8 February 1981, Olympiacos hosted AEK Athens for a League match, which ended 6–0, in an unprecedented triumph for the host team of Piraeus. During the last minutes of the game, thousands of Olympiacos fans at the Gate 7 rushed to the exit, to get to the stadium's main entrance and celebrate with the players, but the doors were almost closed and the turnstiles still in place, making the exit almost impossible. As people continued to come down from the stands, unable to see what happened, the stairs of Gate 7 became a death trap; people were crushed, tens of fans were seriously injured and twenty-one young people died, most of them by suffocation.

In memory of this event, every year on February 8, there is a memorial service at the stadium in honor of the supporters that died in that incident. The service is attended by thousands of fans every year, who are rhythmically shouting the phrase "Αδέλφια, ζείτε, εσείς μας οδηγείτε." (Adhélfia, zíte, esís mas odhiyíte, "Brothers, you live, you are the ones who guide us."). At the tribune part of the stadium where Gate 7 is now, some seats are colored black instead of red, shaping the number "7", whereas there is also a monument on the eastern side of the stadium, bearing the names of all 21 supporters killed on that day in the stadium.

Even though this incident affected almost solely the fanbase of Olympiacos, other teams occasionally pay their respects to the people killed as well, as they consider the incident to be a tragedy not only for one team, but for the whole country. In the past, even foreign teams, such as Liverpool F.C. and Red Star Belgrade have honored the incident's victims.

Gallery

Football

Basketball (men's)

Volleyball (men's)

Water Polo (men's)

Water Polo (women's)

Volleyball (women's)

Basketball (women's)

Racing (Superleague Formula)

References

External links

 

Sports clubs established in 1925
 
Multi-sport clubs in Piraeus
1925 establishments in Greece